2MASS J09393548−2448279 (abbreviated 2MASS 0939−2448) is a probable system of two nearby T-type brown dwarfs, located in constellation Antlia at 17.4 light-years from Earth. The two stars orbit at a distance of 0.0928 AU

Discovery
2MASS 0939−2448 was identified as a brown dwarf through analysis of data from the 2MASS survey by Tinney et al. The discovery was published in 2005.

Properties
Model calculations suggest that 2MASS 0939−2448 is a system of two brown dwarfs with effective temperatures of about 500 and 700 K and masses of about 25 and 40 Jupiter masses; it is also possible that it is a pair of identical objects with temperatures of 600 K and 30 Jupiter masses.

Dimmest known brown dwarf
From publication of the discovery in 2005 till at least 2008, 2MASS 0939−2448, or its dimmer component, was the dimmest brown dwarf known. Later dimmer objects, including (sub)brown dwarfs and rogue planets of new spectral class Y, were discovered, using data from WISE and from other surveys. In 2011–2014, the dimmest known of these objects was WISE 1828+2650, and from 2014 the dimmest one is WISE 0855−0714.

References

Antlia
Binary stars
Brown dwarfs
T-type stars
J09393548−2448279
?
TIC objects